The following is a list of notable people associated with the Kansas Collegiate Athletic Conference.

Basketball

Men's basketball
 Gene Johnson, assistant coach for USA Basketball in the 1936 Olympic Games
 Art Kahler, only person to coach at two different major colleges at the same time – head basketball coach at Brown University and football coach at Dickinson College in Carlisle, Pennsylvania.
 Brad Long, actor who portrayed team captain "Buddy Walker" in the 1986 film Hoosiers
 Arthur Schabinger, enshrined in the Basketball Hall of Fame as a contributor in 1961.

Football
 Willis Bates, former KCAC football coach who also coached the Auburn Tigers
 Vic Baltzell, linebacker for the Boston Redskins in 1935
 Harold Elliott, head coach with over 200 career wins
 Dennis Franchione, former head coach of Alabama and Texas A&M
 Mike Gardner, current coach at Tabor, achieved post-season play in each of his first five years as a head coach
 Clarence Gilyard, actor
 Homer Woodson Hargiss, inventor of the huddle
 Lem Harkey, San Francisco 49ers
 Harold S. Herd, (also track & field) Kansas Supreme Court Justice
 Ed Hiemstra, offensive lineman for the New York Giants
 Ted Kessinger 2010 inductee in College Football Hall of Fame
 Jerry Kill, former head coach for the University of Minnesota
 Rolland Lawrence, cornerback for the Atlanta Falcons from 1973 to 1980.
 Jay Mack Love member of the National Champion 1904 Michigan Wolverines football team
 Alexander Brown Mackie, founder of Brown Mackie College
 Michael P. McCarthy, youngest General Manager ever to win a Canadian Football League championship with the Toronto Argonauts
 John H. Outland, namesake of the Outland Trophy awarded annually to the best college interior lineman
 Ernie Quigley, umpire of six World Series
 Bill Schnebel, named the 1960 "Little All-American Coach of the Year" and NAIA coach of the year.

Track and field

Men's track and field
 Jim Helmer, elected to the NAIA  Coach's Hall of Fame in 2001.

Women's track and field
 Mike Kirkland, Women's coach.  Undefeated at the conference level since named head coach in 1992.

Other
 John Salavantis, broadcaster and former coach at Ottawa University

See also

 Kansas Sports Hall of Fame
 Lists of people from Kansas

References